Bu Liao Qing is a 1947 Chinese film directed by Sang Hu and written by Eileen Chang (who was at the time one of the country's most popular writers).

Plot 
The film's plot is loosely modeled after Charlotte Brontë's Jane Eyre and is considered an example of a sentimental wenyi picture.

Cast 
 Chen Yanyan
 Liu Qiong
 Lu Shan
 Ye Ming

Reception 
The movie—released by the prestigious Wenhua Film Company—was released to popular acclaim.

References 

1947 films
Chinese black-and-white films
1940s Mandarin-language films
Films with screenplays by Eileen Chang